Kim Yoo-mi (born October 12, 1979) is a South Korean actress.

Filmography

Film

Television series

Music video

Awards and nominations

References

External links
 Kim Yoo-mi at Khan Enterprise 
 
 

South Korean film actresses
South Korean television actresses
Living people
1979 births
20th-century South Korean actresses
21st-century South Korean actresses